Potassium chlorochromate is an inorganic compound with the formula KCrO3Cl.  It is the potassium salt of chlorochromate, [CrO3Cl]−.  It is a water-soluble orange compound is used occasionally for oxidation of organic compounds.  It is sometimes called Péligot's salt, in recognition of its discoverer Eugène-Melchior Péligot.

Structure and synthesis
Potassium chlorochromate was originally prepared by treating potassium dichromate with hydrochloric acid.  An improved route involves the reaction of chromyl chloride and potassium chromate:
K2CrO4 + CrO2Cl2 → 2KCrO3Cl

The salt consists of the tetrahedral chlorochromate anion. The average Cr=O bond length is 159 pm, and the Cr-Cl distance is 219 pm.

Reactions
Although air-stable, its aqueous solutions undergo hydrolysis in the presence of strong acids. With concentrated hydrochloric acid, it converts to chromyl chloride, which in turn reacts with water to form chromic acid and additional hydrochloric acid. When treated with 18-crown-6, it forms the lipophilic salt [K(18-crown-6)]CrO3Cl.

Peligot's salt can oxidize benzyl alcohol, a reaction which can be catalyzed by acid. A related salt, pyridinium chlorochromate, is more commonly used for this reaction.

Safety
Potassium chlorochromate is toxic upon ingestion, and may cause irritation, chemical burns, and even ulceration on contact with the skin or eyes. . Like other hexavalent chromium compounds, it is also carcinogenic and mutagenic.

References

Oxidizing agents
Chromates
Potassium compounds